Siyaasat  (English: Politics) is a 2014 Indian fictional drama which aired on The EPIC Channel. The series is an adaptation of the popular 2002 award-winning fictional novel The Twentieth Wife by author Indu Sundaresan.

The series revolves around Mughal politics, inter-personal conflicts, sabotage, grandeur, power and the love between Prince Salim (the Mughal emperor Jahangir) and Mehrunissa also known as Nur Jahan, who was Salim's twentieth and final wife. It is now available on EPIC On, EPIC TV's streaming platform and on Prime Video as well.

Plot
Siyaasat is mainly about the journey of Mehrunissa to become Nur Jahan. It is based in the era of Mughal rule where Akbar is the Emperor. The show focuses on the battle between the princes to become the heir to the throne and also on Salim - Mehrunissa's love story. The other prominent aspects of the show are the politics in the harem between Jagat Gosaini, Ruqaiya Sultan Begum and other women, the rivals of Akbar like Malik Amber, Chand Bibi and Rana Pratap and the political turmoil in Akbar's court between Abul Fazl, Mirza Ghias Beg and Abdul Rahim Khan-I-Khana

Cast
 Uday Tikekar as Emperor Akbar
 Deepika Amin as Empress Ruqaiya Sultan Begum, Akbar's first wife and Padshah Begum. 
 Karanvir Sharma/Sudhanshu Pandey as Prince Salim (Emperor Jahangir), Akbar's eldest son
 Charu Shankar as Mehrunissa (Empress Nur Jahan), wife of Ali Quli Sher Afgan and illicit lover of Prince Salim. She eventually marries her lover, the emperor Jehangir.
 Neetha Shetty as Maan Bai, Salim's first wife and mother of Prince Khusrau.
 Shaynam Ladakhi as Mehmood, Nur Jahan's brother and Hoshiyar's lover.
 Nayani Dixit as Jagat Gosaini, Salim's second wife and later Padshah Begum and the mother of Prince Khurram (future Emperor Shah Jahan). 
 Jannat Zubair Rahmani as Young Mehrunissa
 KC Shankar as Ali Quli (Sher Afghan), a nobleman and husband of Mehrunnisa, who hates Prince Salim because the latter is Mehrunnisa's illicit lover
 Pawan Chopra as Mirza Ghias Beg, Mehrunnisa's father
 Suparna Marwah as Asmat Begum, Mehrunnisa's mother
 Gurpreet Saini as Prince Murad, second son of Akbar
 Mokshad Dodwani as Prince Daniyal, third son of Akbar
 Bikramjeet Kanwarpal as Abu'l-Fazl, a beloved friend, advisor and courtier of Emperor Akbar
 Nagesh Salwan as Abdul Rahim Khan-I-Khana, a courtier of Akbar and Salim who later supports prince Khusrau in his rebellion against his father Salim (Emperor Jehangir)
 Kavin Dave as Qutubuddin Koka, courtier loyal to Salim, appointed commander-in-chief after Salim becomes Emperor
 Omkar Kapoor as Mahabat Khan, courtier loyal to Salim, appointed Grand Vazir (Wazir) after Salim becomes Emperor
 Ravy Sharma as Abu'l-Hasan Asaf Khan, brother of Mehrunissa, father of Arjumand Banu Begum (Mumtaz Mahal)
 Ashraf Nagoo as Hoshiyar Khan, Mehmood's lover. 
Ashnoor Kaur as Arjumand Banu Begum (Mumtaz Mahal)
 Rupali Krishnarao as Sharif un-Nissa (Nadira), a courtesan from Lahore
Devansh Dixit as Shah Jahan

Production 
The series was shot over a period of six months in Bikaner, Rajasthan, with the Laxmi Niwas Palace acting as a substitute for Emperor Akbar's palace in Lahore. Costumes for the series have been designed by Pia Benegal, the daughter of director Shyam Benegal.

Charu Shankar made her Indian television debut with Siyaasat. She described how she bagged the lead role, "I had read all three books in the Taj Mahal trilogy and liked them. The producers called me and said that they were trying to make a Game of Thrones-style series out of it, to which I said, "Excellent. What role do you want me for?" And that is when I got to know that it was for Mehrunissa [Nur Jahan's birth name]. I was driving at that moment and I almost banged my car out of excitement." Shankar described how she prepared for the role of Nur Jahan. "I had a month to prepare for the role before we went to Bikaner, which is where we shot the series. I happened to be doing an art history course at the National Museum at that time and I spent it at the gallery studying Mughal miniatures and trying to imagine the world that Mehrunissa lived in."

The show has been shot across various scenic locales in Rajasthan and real palaces of Bikaner. Siyaasat brings alive the decadent lifestyle, architecture, art, and stories of the Mughal royalty.

References

External links
 

Indian television series
2014 Indian television series debuts
Indian historical television series
Indian period television series
Hindi-language television shows
Indian drama television series
Epic TV original programming
Television shows based on Indian novels
Mughal Empire in fiction
Cultural depictions of Akbar
Television series set in the 17th century
Cultural depictions of Jahangir